Madars Razma (born 26 September 1988) is a Latvian professional darts player nicknamed Latvian Razmatazz who plays in Professional Darts Corporation (PDC) events. He won the Latvia National Championships in 2010, 2012, 2014, 2015, and 2016.

Career
In 2013, Razma qualified for the last 32 of the World Masters (losing 0–3 to Geert De Vos). He qualified for the 2014 BDO World Darts Championship, after finishing top of the Baltic and Scandinavia qualification table. He won the 2013 Riga Open and Finnish Open, reached the semi-finals of the Tallukka Open and Lithuania Open, and quarter-finals of the German Gold Cup and Polish Open, and won the 2013 Antwerp Open pairs along with Ron Meulenkamp. At the 2014 World Championship he beat John Michael to reach the last 32 stage before losing to Geert De Vos. The following year, after a consistent season, Razma upset fifth seed Martin Phillips 3–0 in the first round. He was beaten 3–4 in the second round by Brian Dawson.

At the 2016 World Championship, Razma beat Gary Robson in the first round 3–1, before losing to Jamie Hughes 1–4 in the second round.

Razma entered the Professional Darts Corporation's Qualifying School in 2017. A run to the last eight on the second day saw Razma finish twelfth on the Q School Order of Merit, earning the final Tour Card on offer and making him the first Latvian to hold one.

Razma made his first PDC final at the nineteenth Players Championship of 2018, losing in the final to Max Hopp, 3–6. This helped qualify him for his first televised PDC event, the 2018 Players Championship Finals.

Following a disappointing end to 2018 as Razma failed to produce a significant run at the 2018 Players Championship Finals and came agonisingly close to qualifying for the 2019 PDC World Darts Championship, he managed to regain his PDC Tour Card at European Q-School in January 2019. A run to the final on the third day saw Razma finish first on the Order of Merit, giving him at least another two years on the PDC ProTour.

Razma is known for his preference for throwing for treble 19 rather than the standard treble 20.

World Championship results

BDO
 2014: First round (lost to Geert De Vos 1–3)
 2015: Second round (lost to Brian Dawson 3–4)
 2016: Second round (lost to Jamie Hughes 1–4)

PDC
 2020: First round (lost to Harry Ward 2–3)
 2021: Second round (lost to Gary Anderson 1–3)
 2022: First round (lost to Steve Lennon 1–3)
 2023: Second round (lost to Gary Anderson 1–3)

Performance timeline
BDO

PDC

PDC European Tour

References

External links

Latvian darts players
Living people
1988 births
Professional Darts Corporation current tour card holders
British Darts Organisation players
People from Priekule Municipality
PDC World Cup of Darts Latvian team
People from Liepāja
21st-century Latvian people